Symphony No. 12 is a composition by the Brazilian composer Heitor Villa-Lobos, written in 1957. A performance lasts about twenty-five minutes.

History
Villa-Lobos composed his Twelfth Symphony in New York in 1957, completing it on his seventieth birthday, 5 March 1957. The score is dedicated to Mindinha (Arminda Neves d'Almeida), the composer's companion for the last 23 years of his life. It was first performed at Lisner Auditorium in Washington, DC, on 20 April 1958, by the National Symphony Orchestra, conducted by Howard Mitchell. The European premiere occurred soon after, in Brussels on 22 September 1958, by the Grand Orchestre Symphonique de la Radiodiffusion Nationale Belge, conducted by the composer.

Analysis
The symphony consists of four movements:
Allegro non troppo
Adagio
Scherzo (Vivace)
Molto Allegro
The form of the first movement resembles a five-part (ABACA) rondo, with a coda in which the main theme returns in augmentation .

The second movement is in a ternary (ABA) design, and leads without break into the third movement.

Like the first movement, the scherzo is in a five-part rondo form, except that the returns of the main A section are in different keys, and the second occurrence is immediately after the first: A A' B C A''.

The finale is also in a modified five-part rondo form. As in the scherzo, the refrain returns in keys different from its initial appearance.

References

Cited sources

References

 Béhague, Gerard. 1994. Villa-Lobos: The Search for Brazil's Musical Soul. Austin: Institute of Latin American Studies, University of Texas at Austin, 1994. .
 Peppercorn, Lisa M. 1991. Villa-Lobos: The Music: An Analysis of His Style, translated by Stefan de Haan. London: Kahn & Averill; White Plains, NY: Pro/Am Music Resources Inc.  (Kahn & Averill); .
 Salles, Paulo de Tarso. 2009. Villa-Lobos: processos composicionais. Campinas, SP: Editora da Unicamp. .

Symphonies by Heitor Villa-Lobos
1957 compositions
Music with dedications